The Dubai Desert Classic is a European Tour golf tournament held on Majlis course at Emirates Golf Club in Dubai, United Arab Emirates. In 1999 and 2000 it was held at Dubai Creek Golf & Yacht Club, all other editions have been held at Emirates Golf Club.

History
When founded in 1989, it was the first European Tour event to be staged in the Arabian Peninsula, but is currently one of six.

The tournament is part of a wider strategy, via a government program called "Dubai Golf", to develop both professional and casual golf tourism in Dubai. It has historically had one of the strongest fields on the European Tour due to "promotional" money paid to top golfers.

The 1995 edition is notable for being the first live event broadcast on the Golf Channel, an American pay-television network.

In September 2021, it was announced that the event would gain a new title sponsor, Slync.io, in 2022. The deal was terminated in September 2022.

In January 2023, it was confirmed that Hero MotoCorp would become the new title sponsor of the event, beginning in 2023.

Winners

References

External links

Coverage on European Tour's official site

European Tour events
Golf tournaments in the United Arab Emirates
Desert Classic
Recurring sporting events established in 1989
1989 establishments in the United Arab Emirates
Winter events in the United Arab Emirates